The  is a railway line in Japan operated by the Central Japan Railway Company (JR Central). It connects Kōzu Station in Odawara to Numazu via Gotemba.

The Mt. Fuji limited express service runs between Tokyo's Shinjuku Station and Gotemba via Matsuda.

Station list

Rolling stock

Local services 
 211 series
 313 series

Limited express Mt. Fuji (formerly named Asagiri) services 
 Odakyu 60000 series MSE (from March 2012)

Past 
 113 series
 Odakyu 3000 series SE (until 1991)
 115 series (until 2007)
 E231 series (until March 2012)
 371 series (Asagiri services, until March 2012)
 Odakyu 20000 series RSE (Asagiri services, until March 2012)

History
The present-day Gotemba Line was built as part of the original route of the Tōkaidō Main Line connecting Tokyo with Osaka. The portion between Kōzu and Numazu was opened on February 1, 1889, although it was not officially named the "Tokaido Line" until 1896. Portions were double tracked from 1891 and the double tracking was completed by 1901.

The line took an indirect route between Kōzu and Numazu in order to avoid the Hakone Mountains, which affected the potential journey time between Tokyo and Osaka. A more direct route had been planned as early as 1909, but technical difficulties delayed the completion of the Tanna Tunnel until December 1, 1934. With the opening of the tunnel, the route of the Tōkaidō Main Line became via Atami Station, leaving the section between Kōzu Station and Numazu Station as a spur line renamed as the Gotemba Line.

In 1943, due to the reduced traffic on the Gotemba line, and the urgent requirement for steel in World War II, the line was returned to a single track railway. Diesel multiple units replaced Steam locomotive hauled passenger trains in 1955, and a cooperative agreement was reached with the privately owned Odakyu Electric Railway to operate express trains directly from Shinjuku Station in Tokyo in the same year. The line was electrified from 1968, and regularly scheduled freight services were discontinued at most stations by 1982.

A new Centralized traffic control system was installed in December 1989, with a programmed route control system implemented from March 1990. Installation for the TOICA automated turnstile system was completed at all stations in 2010.

Former connecting lines
 Gotemba station - A 19 km 762mm gauge horse tramway opened to Kawaguchiko in 1898, closed in 1905 but was reopened in 1909. It connected to the Tsuru horse tramway, providing a connection to Otsuki station on the Chuo Main Line until 1919, when it was truncated by 9 km, completely closing 10 years later.
 Shimo-Togari station - The Izu Railway Co. opened a line to Shuzenji in 1898, electrifying the line at 1500V DC in 1918. In 1934 following the opening of the Tanna Tunnel and associated realignment, the line was truncated to Mishima-Hirokoji station on the Tokaido Main Line.

References

 

 
Lines of Central Japan Railway Company
Railway lines in Kanagawa Prefecture
Rail transport in Shizuoka Prefecture
1067 mm gauge railways in Japan
Railway lines opened in 1889